Shirley McGreal  (born Shirley Pollitt; 4 May 193420 November 2021) was a British animal welfare activist and conservationist. She founded the International Primate Protection League.

Early life and education

McGreal was born Shirley Pollitt in Mobberley, Cheshire, on May 4, 1934. Her parents were Kate ( Pearson) and Allan Pollitt, a bank manager. She had an identical twin sister, Jean, with whom she developed an early interest in activism.

She studied Latin and French at Royal Holloway, University of London. She graduated in 1955. She studied postgraduate French at the University of Illinois. She received a PhD in education in 1971 from the University of Cincinnati.

Animal welfare
McGreal’s entry into the protection of animals was in 1971 when she was in Thailand. At the Bangkok Airport she saw crates with monkeys that were being shipped. She looked for an organization that could help her save such animals but found none. In 1973 she founded the International Primate Protection League. She settled the headquarters of the organization in Summerville, South Carolina and initiated a sanctuary for gibbon monkeys.

She achieved bans on the export of primates in India and Bangladesh, and protested the use of the animals at a University of California, Davis laboratory of the United States government and the US Armed Forces Radiobiology Research Institute. She uncovered a smuggling operation where primates were being sent from other countries to Singapore for export. She exposed the operation in an article in the Bangkok Post, which resulted in action by the Singapore government. She argued against euthanizing chimps that have been used in medical research, saying that they deserve "a decent retirement".

Although she decried the use of animals in research, she conceded that the practice would continue and therefore advocated for better living conditions and quality of life for the animals.

In 1983 she wrote a letter to the editor of the Journal of Medical Primatology criticizing the Austrian manufacturer Immuno AG, for its treatment of animals in its research. Immuno responded by charging McGreal with libel. Although it was argued that the letter was an opinion and therefore not libelous, McGreal settled due to the cost of continuing the suit.

Personal life and death
She married John McGreal, an engineer, in 1960. They lived in India and Thailand, where he was working for the United Nations. She died at her residence on the grounds of the sanctuary she founded in Summerville, South Carolina on November 20, 2021 at the age of 87.

Awards and recognition
 Order of the British Empire, 2008
 Interpol Wildlife Crime Group and the Dutch Police League, 1994

References

1934 births
2021 deaths
Alumni of Royal Holloway, University of London
British animal welfare workers
British conservationists
British identical twins
Officers of the Order of the British Empire
People from Mobberley
University of Cincinnati alumni
University of Illinois Urbana-Champaign alumni